Acrocercops aeglophanes is a moth of the family Gracillariidae. It is known from Queensland.

References

aeglophanes
Moths of Australia
Moths described in 1913